Attack on the Gold Escort is a 1911 Australian silent Western film which is considered lost. It was sometimes known as Captain Midnight, King of the Bushrangers, or Attack of the Gold Escort, or Captain Starlight's Attack on the Gold Escort.

The film was called "an Exciting and Thrilling Reproduction of Australian Early Days. A vivid portrayal of bush adventure, acted by Australian artistes, amid Australian scenery" which was filmed "at the exact spot where the incident happened."

The movie is often confused with Captain Midnight, the Bush King and Captain Starlight, or Gentleman of the Road. However it seems it was a separate movie.

Plot
The gold escort from the Bank of Australia is attacked by bushrangers. It is chased down Evandsford Hill.

Reception
The film made its debut on 19 June 1911 in Geelong.

The Kapunda Herald said the film "portrayed the terrors of the road, during the time when bushranging was rife, in a vivid and realistic manner."

References

External links
 Attack on the Gold Escort at AustLit
 

1911 films
1911 Western (genre) films
1911 lost films
Australian black-and-white films
Bushranger films
Films set in colonial Australia
Lost Australian films
Lost Western (genre) films
Silent Australian Western (genre) films
Silent drama films